The CAFA Women's Championship is the competition in women's football organised by the Central Asian Football Federation, contested by the national teams of nations in Central Asia. The official tournament started in 2018, hosted by Uzbekistan and won by Uzbekistan.

Results

Comprehensive team results by tournament
Legend
 – Champions
 – Runners-up
 – Third place
 – Fourth place
Q – Qualified for upcoming tournament
 – Did not qualify
 – Did not enter / Withdrew / Banned
 – Hosts

For each tournament, the number of teams (in brackets) are shown.

Overall team records
Teams are ranked by total points, then by goal difference, then by goals scored.

Awards

Winning coaches

Top goalscorers

Fair play award

See also
 CAFA Championship
 AFF Women's Championship
 EAFF E-1 Football Championship (women)
 SAFF Women's Championship
 WAFF Women's Championship
 AFC Women's Asian Cup

References

 
CAFA competitions
Women's association football competitions in Asia
Recurring sporting events established in 2018
2018 establishments in Asia